The 2020–21 season is CSKA Sofia's 72nd season in the Parva Liga (the top flight of Bulgarian football) and their fifth consecutive participation after their administrative relegation in the third division due to mounting financial troubles. In addition to the domestic league, CSKA Sofia participates in this season's edition of the Bulgarian Cup and UEFA Europa League. This article shows player statistics and all matches (official and friendly) that the club will play during the 2020–21 season.

Players

Squad information

Transfers

In

Out

Pre-season and friendlies

Competitions

Overview

Parva Liga

Regular Stage

League table

Results summary

Results by round

Results

Championship round

League table

Results summary

Results by round

Results

Bulgarian Cup

UEFA Europa League

First qualifying round

Second qualifying round

Third qualifying round

Play-off round

Group stage

Statistics

Appearances and goals

|-
|colspan="14"|Players away from the club on loan:
|-

|-
|colspan="14"|Players who appeared for CSKA Sofia that left during the season:
|-

|}

Goalscorers

Disciplinary Record
Includes all competitive matches. Players listed below made at least one appearance for CSKA first squad during the season.

See also 
PFC CSKA Sofia

References

External links 
CSKA Official Site

PFC CSKA Sofia seasons
CSKA Sofia
CSKA Sofia